STS-85 was a Space Shuttle Discovery mission to perform multiple space science packages. It was launched from Kennedy Space Center, Florida, on 7 August 1997.
A major experiment was the CRISTA-SPAS free-flyer which had various telescopes on board.

Crew

Mission highlights

The deployment and retrieval of a satellite designed to study Earth's middle atmosphere along with a test of potential International Space Station hardware highlighted NASA's sixth Shuttle mission of 1997. The prime payload for the flight, the Cryogenic Infrared Spectrometers and Telescopes for the Atmosphere-Shuttle Pallet Satellite-2 (CRISTA-SPAS-2) made its second flight on the Space Shuttle (previous flight STS-66 in 1994) and was the fourth mission in a cooperative venture between the German Space Agency (DARA) and NASA.

During the flight, Davis used Discovery'''s robot arm to deploy the CRISTA-SPAS payload for about 9 days of free-flight. CRISTA-SPAS consists of three telescopes and four spectrometers that measured trace gases and dynamics of the Earth's middle atmosphere. Davis also operated the robot arm for CRISTA-SPAS retrieval. The Shuttle Pallet Satellite (SPAS) on which the scientific instruments were mounted is a self-contained platform that provides power, command, control and communication with Discovery'' during free-flight.

Two other instruments mounted on the SPAS also studied the Earth's atmosphere. The Middle Atmosphere High Resolution Spectrograph Instrument (MAHRSI) measured hydroxyl and nitric oxide by sensing UV radiation emitted and scattered by the atmosphere, while the Surface Effects Sample Monitor (SESAM) was a passive carrier for state-of-the-art optical surfaces to study the impact of the atomic oxygen and the space environment on materials and services.

The crew also supported the Manipulator Flight Demonstration (MFD) experiment being sponsored by NASDA, the Japanese Space Agency. MFD consists of three separate experiments located on a support truss in the payload bay. The primary objective was to demonstrate the newly designed dexterous robot arm in the space environment, before installing on the Japanese Experiment Module (JEM) of the International Space Station.

Several Hitchhiker payloads, including the Technology Applications and Science Payload (TAS-01), the International Extreme Ultraviolet Hitchhiker (IEH-02), and the Ultraviolet Spectrograph Telescope for Astronomical Research (UVSTAR) were housed in Discovery's payload bay, operating independently of crew support during the flight.

The Microgravity Vibration Isolation Mount (MIM) experiment was operated by Canadian Space Agency astronaut Bjarni Tryggvason. The MIM experiment is a small double-locker size device designed to isolate International Space Station payloads and experiments from disturbances created by thruster firings or crew activity. MIM was operated for 30 hours with real-time data transmission to investigators on the ground. (Reference NASA Press Release 96–224)

Another experiment onboard STS-85 was the Southwest Ultraviolet Imaging System (SWUIS-01) from the Southwest Research Institute (SwRI) along with scientific collaborators from JPL, APL, and the University of Maryland. SWUIS (pronounced, "swiss") is a wide-field UV imager to which was used to observe comet Hale-Bopp. It is based around an 18-cm Maksutov UV telescope and a UV-sensitive, Xybion image-intensified CCD camera that frames at video rates (30 Hz). Each SWUIS observation period lasted approximately 3 hours, and garnered approximately 10^5 images in up to 7 filter bandpasses. SWUIS was operated from a 2-axis mount inside the Shuttle mid-deck cockpit, and looked out of the Shuttle through a quartz window. SWUIS can be pointed anywhere in a 4.5 deg cone around the centerline of the comet. Mission specialists set up and operated the instrument.

On Day 8, the crew was awakened by the song "You Will Go to the Moon" by Canadian artists Moxy Früvous, selected by astronaut Marc Garneau, the first Canadian in space.

The mission lasted a day longer than originally planned due to a threat of ground fog at Kennedy Space Center.

Media

See also

List of human spaceflights
List of Space Shuttle missions
Outline of space science

External links
 
 NASA mission summary 
 STS-85 Video Highlights 

Spacecraft launched in 1997
Space Shuttle missions
Articles containing video clips